University College of Engineering, Nagercoil (UCEN) is a constituent college of Anna University located at Nagercoil Industrial estate, Konam, Nagercoil, Kanyakumari, Tamil Nadu 629004. It was established in 2009 by the Tamil Nadu Government.

Academics 
The institute offers undergraduate courses leading to the degree of Bachelor of Engineering, in various fields. Postgraduate courses award the Master of Engineering degree in part-time mode.

Admission
Undergraduate students are admitted based on competitive student rankings in twelfth standard (higher secondary course) examination. The ranking and subsequent counseling are done by Anna University.

Postgraduate students are typically selected based on the competitive rankings in Tamil Nadu Common Entrance Test (TANCET).

Departments 

Civil Engineering
Computer science and Engineering
Electronics and Communication Engineering
Mechanical Engineering
Electrical and Electronics Engineering
Information Technology
Master of Business Administration

Programmes Offered

Dean 
Dr.V.A.NAGARAJAN ,  Ph.D,

Former Deans
Dr. T.V.S.Pillai, Ph.D., is the Dean i/c.

Library
UCEN's library has a collection of handpicked necessary books and magazines.

The library has computers connected to the internet with sufficient bandwidth for the utilization of staff and students.

Placement 
UCEN has a Training and Placement Wing to train the students and to manage the placements in the college. The Training and Placement
Wing provides academic-industry bridge training as well as personality development training.  It is run by volunteer student representatives under the supervision of Training and Placement Officer. The student representatives develop industry ready design, analysis, and simulation courses such as proE, ansys, catia, pcb design, web development, staddpro and software development. Peer to peer technology training and project development motivated. The Training and Placement Wing established several industry collaborations in the area of IT and ITES. It released several software programs developed by students.

Official links 
UCEN

Ranking
UCEN is ranked #7 among 497 Non-Autonomous Engineering institutes ( Not Architectural Colleges) affiliated to Anna University. The ranking is based on pass percentage of students during April–May 2013 University exams.

References

Engineering colleges in Tamil Nadu
Colleges affiliated to Anna University
Universities and colleges in Kanyakumari district
Education in Nagercoil
Educational institutions established in 1989
1989 establishments in Tamil Nadu